{{DISPLAYTITLE:C16H12O8}}
The molecular formula C16H12O8 (molar mass: 332.26 g/mol, exact mass: 332.053217 u) may refer to:

 Annulatin, a flavanol
 Europetin, a flavonol
 Laricitrin, a flavonol
 Mearnsetin, a flavonol
 5-O-Methylmyricetin, a flavonol
 Patuletin, a flavonol

Molecular formulas